La commare secca (literally "The skinny gossip", English title The Grim Reaper)  is a 1962 Italian film written and directed by Bernardo Bertolucci, based on a short story by Pier Paolo Pasolini. It was Bertolucci's directorial debut at age 21.

Plot
The story is very similar to Akira Kurosawa's influential Rashomon, though in an interview Bertolucci denied having seen that film at the time.

The film begins with the brutal image of a prostitute's corpse on the bank of the Tiber in Rome. We then see a series of interrogations of suspects by the police, all of whom are known to have been in a nearby park at the time of the murder. Each suspect recounts his activities during the day and evening, and each narrative serves as a slice of life story. A young man tells the police that he was meeting with priests in order to get a job recommendation, though we see that he and his friends spent the time trying to rob lovers in the park. A gigolo treats both his girlfriends badly. A soldier fails in his attempts at picking up a number of women and falls asleep on a park bench. Two teenage boys share a pleasant afternoon in the company of two teenage girls but end up stealing from a homosexual man in the park.

The final flashback depicts the prostitute's murder by a man in clogs who had been interrogated previously and who is finally apprehended at a dance.

Each narrative is interrupted by a sudden thunderstorm, which in each case leads to an interlude at the prostitute's apartment as she prepares for her evening.

Critical reception
Critic John Simon called La commare secca "pure trash".

References

External links
 
 
La commare secca an essay by David Thompson at the Criterion Collection

1962 films
Italian black-and-white films
1960s Italian-language films
1960s mystery films
1962 crime drama films
Police detective films
Films directed by Bernardo Bertolucci
Films scored by Carlo Rustichelli
Films set in Rome
1962 directorial debut films
1960s Italian films